Peter Fenelon Collier (December 12, 1849 – April 23, 1909) was an Irish-American publisher, the founder of the publishing company P. F. Collier & Son, and in 1888 founded Collier's Weekly.

Biography
He was born in Myshall, County Carlow, Ireland, on December 12, 1849, to Robert Collier and Catherine Fenelon. He emigrated to Dayton, Ohio, United States, in 1866 when he was seventeen years old. He attended St. Mary's Seminary in Cincinnati for four years. He then worked for Sadler and Company, a publisher of schoolbooks. With $300 that he saved as a salesman, he bought the printing plates to Father Burke's Lectures. In a single year, his sales were $90,000. In July 1873 he married Catherine Dunne.

In 1874, he published a biography of Pius IX and later published Chandler's Encyclopedia and     Chamber's Encyclopedia. He then began publishing "Collier's Library", a series of popular novels.

He later formed his own publishing company printing books for the Roman Catholic market. He founded Collier's Once a Week in April 1888. It was advertised as a magazine of "fiction, fact, sensation, wit, humor, news". By 1892, Collier's Once a Week had a circulation of over 250,000, and was one of the largest selling magazines in the United States. In 1895, the name was changed to Collier's Weekly: An Illustrated Journal.

Collier died on April 23, 1909. His will left most of his estate to his wife and son. His estate included shares in the Rumson Polo Club, Monmouth Agricultural Fair Association, co-ownership of Colliers Weekly, shares in the Meadow Yacht Club, shares in the Kentucky Horse Show Company, Tammany Publishing Company and a life insurance policy. All his assets were liquidated and amounted to $2,890,440 (approximately $ today). His wife received a life estate and an annuity of $33,044. His son received $2,280,410 and the rest was distributed to various organizations.

Legacy

Publishing
His son, Robert Joseph Collier, took over as publisher of Collier's Weekly. When Norman Hapgood joined Harper's Weekly in 1912, Robert Collier became the new editor. Circulation continued to grow, and by 1917, circulation reached one million. Robert Collier (1885–1950), his nephew, founded Robert Collier Publications.

Collier Prize
The Collier Prize for State Government Accountability was created in 2019, established to honor Peter Fenelon Collier's vision and to encourage investigative and political reporting at the state level. Sponsored by Nathan S. Collier (The Collier Companies Founder and a descendant of Robert Collier) and administered jointly by the White House Correspondents’ Association and the University of Florida College of Journalism and Communications, the journalism prize was first awarded in 2020. The inaugural prize was awarded to The Oregonian for Polluted by Money, a four part series investigating campaign contributions. Honorable mentions were awarded for Copy, Paste, Legislate (Center for Public Integrity and USA Today) and Beaten, then silenced (The Philadelphia Inquirer).

References

American publishers (people)
1849 births
1909 deaths
Collier's
American magazine founders
Irish emigrants to the United States (before 1923)
People from County Carlow
19th-century American businesspeople
Collier (publishing company)